Eugen Besnik Shima (born 31 October 1992) is a professional Albanian footballer who most recently played as a defender for Turbina Cërrik in the Albanian First Division.

Honours
KF Tirana
 Albanian Cup (1): 2010–11

References

External links
 Profile - FSHF

1992 births
Living people
Footballers from Tirana
Albanian footballers
Albania youth international footballers
Association football defenders
KF Tirana players
KF Adriatiku Mamurrasi players
Besëlidhja Lezhë players
KS Turbina Cërrik players
Kategoria Superiore players
Kategoria e Parë players